The Bayview Place DCBank Open is a golf tournament on PGA Tour Canada. It is the longest running tour event. It is currently played at the Uplands Golf Club in Oak Bay, British Columbia. It has been played at several courses on a rotating basis, all in the Victoria, British Columbia area.

Originally played as the Victoria Open in 1981, the tournament was revived in 1984 as a stop on the PGA Tour's satellite Tournament Players Series. That series ended after the 1985 season, and the Victoria Open then became a fixture on the Canadian Tour.

Tournament hosts

Winners
Royal Beach Victoria Open
2022  Scott Stevens

Reliance Properties DCBank Open
2021  Blair Bursey

Bayview Place DCBank Open presented by Times Colonist
2019  Paul Barjon
2018  Sam Fidone

Bayview Place Cardtronics Open presented by Times Colonist
2017  Max Rottluff

Bayview Place Island Savings Open presented by Times Colonist
2016  Adam Cornelson
2015  Albin Choi
2014  Josh Persons

Times Colonist Island Savings Open
2013  Stephen Gangluff
2012  Andrew Roque
2011  José de Jesús Rodríguez

Times Colonist Open
2010  Brock Mackenzie
2009  Byron Smith
2008  Daniel Im
2007  Spencer Levin
2006  Mike Grob
2005  Craig Taylor
2004  David Hearn 

Victoria Open
2003  Patrick Damron
2002  Scott Hend

Shell Payless Open
2001  Paul Devenport
2000  Jason Bohn
1999  Ken Duke

Payless Open
1998  Jay Hobby
1997  Rick Todd
1996  Arden Knoll
1995  Norm Jarvis
1994  Matt Jackson
1993  Brandt Jobe
1992  Mike Colandro

Payless–Pepsi Open
1991  Rick Todd
1990  Steve Stricker
Payless–Pepsi Victoria Open
1989  Kelly Gibson
Payless Victoria Open
1988  Todd Erwin
Payless Canadian Tournament Players Championship
1987  Craig Parry
1986  Bob Panasik
Victoria Open IEC Classic
1985  Jeff Sanders
PEZ Victoria Open
1984  Charlie Bolling
Victoria Open
1982–83 No tournament
1981  Dave Barr

References

External links

Coverage on PGA Tour Canada's official site

Golf tournaments in British Columbia
PGA Tour Canada events
Recurring sporting events established in 1981
1981 establishments in British Columbia